Rob Eastaway is an English author. He is active in the popularisation of mathematics and was awarded the Zeeman medal  in 2017 for excellence in the promotion of maths. He is best known for his books, including the bestselling Why Do Buses Come in Threes? and Maths for Mums and Dads.  His first book was What is a Googly?, an explanation of cricket for Americans and other newcomers to the game.

Eastaway is a keen cricketer and was one of the originators of the International Rankings of Cricketers. He is also a puzzle setter and adviser for New Scientist magazine and he has appeared frequently on BBC Radio 4 and 5 Live.

He is the director of Maths Inspiration, a national programme of maths lectures for teenagers which involves some of the UK’s leading maths speakers. He was president of the UK Mathematical Association for 2007/2008. He is a former pupil of The King's School, Chester, and has a degree in engineering and management science from the University of Cambridge.

Books
 1992: What is a Googly?
 1995: The Guinness Book of Mindbenders, co-author David Wells
 1998: Why do Buses Come in Threes?, co-author Jeremy Wyndham, foreword by Tim Rice
 1999: The Memory Kit
 2002: How Long is a Piece of String?, co-author Jeremy Wyndham
 2004: How to Remember
 2005: How to Take a Penalty, co-author John Haigh
 2007: How to Remember (Almost) Everything Ever
 2007: Out of the Box
 2008: How Many Socks Make a Pair?
 2009: Improve Your Memory Today, with Dr Hilary Jones
 2010: Maths for Mums and Dads, co-author Mike Askew
 2011: The Hidden Mathematics of Sport (new edition of Beating the Odds)
 2013: More Maths for Mums and Dads, co-author Mike Askew
 2016: Maths on the Go, co-author Mike Askew
 2017: Any ideas? Tips and Techniques to Help You Think Creatively
 2018: 100 Maddening Mindbending Puzzles
 2019: Maths On The Back of an Envelope

References

External links
 Rob Eastaway's Official Website
 Maths Inspiration Website
 
  

Alumni of Christ's College, Cambridge
Living people
Mathematics popularizers
People educated at The King's School, Chester
Year of birth missing (living people)